Argent is the heraldic tincture of silver.

Argent may also refer to:

Entertainment 
 Argent (band), a 1960s–1970s British rock band
 Argent (album), a 1970 album by the band
 Rod Argent (born 1945), keyboardist and founding member of The Zombies and Argent
 Argent (comics), a DC Comics fictional superheroine
 Argent (TV channel), a defunct Canadian French-language cable channel
 Argent energy, a fictional form of energy seen in the Doom video game series

Business 
 Argent Corporation, a defunct hotel/casino company in Las Vegas, Nevada, U.S.
 Argent Ventures, a privately held real estate company based in New York City
 Argent LLP, a UK property developer; see King's Cross Central
 Argent Mortgage, a unit of the defunct American company Ameriquest Mortgage

Other uses 
 Argent (surname)
 Argent (Middlesex cricketer), 19th-century English cricketer
 Argent Centre, a historic building in Birmingham, England
 Argent-sur-Sauldre, a commune in France

See also 
 Argenta (disambiguation)
 L'Argent (disambiguation)
 Montagne d'Argent, a hill in north-east French Guiana